Brian Green may refer to:

In real life
Brian Green (athlete) (born 1941), British sprinter
Brian Green (author) (born 1951), a pseudonym used by American author Orson Scott Card
Brian Green (barrister) (born 1956), British barrister
Brian Green (baseball), American baseball coach
Brian Green (footballer) (1935–2012), British football (soccer) coach
Brian Green (game developer) (often under the pseudonym of Psychochild), American game developer -- Created the first 3d, MMORPG ever in 1995.
Brian Austin Green (born 1973), American actor
Brian Lane Green (born 1962), American stage actor
In fiction
Brian Green (Torchwood), The Right Honourable Brian Green, a character from the British TV show Torchwood

See also
Brian Greene (born 1963), American physicist
Brian Greene (politician), American state legislator in Utah
Brian Greene (American football) (born 1972), American football player
Bryan Green (born 1957), Australian politician
Bryan Green (priest) (1901–1993), author and priest